Hughes is a ghost town in Hardin County, in the U.S. state of Iowa.

History
A post office was established at Hughes in 1890, and remained in operation until it was discontinued in 1901. Hughes was named for H. M. Hughes, a railroad official.

Hughes' population was 15 in 1940.

References

Geography of Hardin County, Iowa
Ghost towns in Iowa
1890 establishments in Iowa